The results of the 2016, 7th Tarang Cine Awards, was presented annually by the Tarang entertainment television channel to honor artistic and technical excellence in the Oriya language film industry of India ("Ollywood"), are as follow:
7th Tarang  Cine Awards 2016
7th Tarang  Cine Awards 2016 Winners List

External links
 7th Tarang  Cine Awards 2016
 7th Tarang Cine Awards 2016 Winners List

2016 Indian film awards
Tarang Cine Awards